This is a list of online advertising technology companies.

4INFO
Adbot
Adform
Adobe Systems
ADTECH
Adtile Technologies
Afilias
Alawar Entertainment
 Amazon.com
AppNexus
Badgeville
BrightRoll
comScore
Criteo
Daylife
Digital Element
dotMobi
eBuddy
eDirectory
Enplug
Facebook
Fiksu
Fluent, Inc.
Google Inc.
InMobi
Integral Ad Science
Marin Software
Matomy Media
mBlox
Media.net
Metaverse Mod Squad
Neustar
Newsmax Media
OpenMarket
OpenX
Optimal Payments
OrangeSoda
Oracle Corporation
Quantcast
Rapleaf
Rocket Fuel
Rubicon Project
Sedo
Sitecore
Softlayer
Softonic
Sony DADC
Taykey
Triton Digital
TubeMogul
Unified
Velti
Venable LLP
Yippy
YuMe
ZEDO
Zeta Interactive

Advertising technology
Technology